Väike-Rakke may refer to several places in Estonia:

Väike-Rakke, Lääne-Viru County, village in Rakke Parish, Lääne-Viru County
Väike-Rakke, Tartu County, village in Rannu Parish, Tartu County

et:Väike-Rakke